Glipa kusamai is a species of beetle in the genus Glipa. It was described in 1999.

References

kusamai
Beetles described in 1999